William III, Count of Nevers (c. 1107 – 21 November 1161) was Count of Nevers, Auxerre and Tonnerre (1148–1161). He was born in Auxerre.

Family 
He was a son of William II of Nevers and his wife Adelaide. The ancestry of his mother is unknown.

His brother Renaud of Nevers was Count of Torrene until his death in 1148, while participating in the  Second Crusade. Robert of Nevers, another brother, is only mentioned in a charter dating to 1134. Their sister Anne of Nevers was married with William VIII, Count of Auvergne, also known as "William the Old" (reign 1155–1182). They were parents to Robert IV, Count of Auvergne (reign 1182–1194).

Life account 
He is recorded as co-signing legal decisions by his father in charter dating to 1121 and 1134. On 21 September 1137, Orderic Vitalis records him accompanying Geoffrey V of Anjou in his entry in the Duchy of Normandy, as part of the conflict between Matilda, Countess of Anjou and her cousin Stephen of England. Their struggle lasted from 1135 to 1154 and is known as The Anarchy.

William III joined Louis VII of France in the Second Crusade. On 21 August 1148, his father died and William III succeeded him in Nevers and Auxerre. He is considered to have succeeded his younger brother in Tonnere at about the same time.

Marriage 
William III married Ida of Sponheim. She was a daughter of Engelbert, Duke of Carinthia and Uta of Passau. They had at least five children:

William IV, Count of Nevers (died 24 October 1168). 
Guy, Count of Nevers (died 19 October 1175). 
Renaud of Nevers, Lord of Decize, died on Third Crusade at the Siege of Acre (1189–91). 
Adelaide of Nevers married Renaud IV, Count of Joigny. 
Ermengarde of Nevers.

References

External links
"The Dynasty of Carantania and their relations with France" by Jožko Šavli, an article covering Ida of Carinthia and her relations

1100s births
1161 deaths
Counts of Nevers
Counts of Auxerre
Christians of the Second Crusade